Ancylosis pyrethrella is a species of snout moth in the genus Ancylosis. It was described by Gottlieb August Wilhelm Herrich-Schäffer in 1860. It is found in Romania, Russia and Turkey.

References

Moths described in 1860
pyrethrella
Moths of Europe
Moths of Asia